Samuel Abdul Cuburu Cano (20 February 1928 – before 2018) was a Mexican professional footballer. He was born in Orizaba, Veracruz. He played in the Mexican first division as well as in the 1950 FIFA World Cup in Brazil.

Club career
Cuburu, nicknamed "Chapela", played club football with Puebla in the 1950s. His brother, José Antonio "El Perro" Cuburu, also played with Puebla. He appeared for Zacatepec in the 1954–55 Campeón de Campeones.

International career
Cuburu made four appearances for the Mexico national football team from 1949 to 1956.

References

External links
 

1928 births
Year of death missing
Footballers from Veracruz
People from Orizaba
Mexican footballers
Mexico international footballers
1950 FIFA World Cup players
Club Puebla players
Club Atlético Zacatepec players
Liga MX players
Association football midfielders